Elisa Badenes is a Spanish ballet dancer who is currently a principal dancer at the Stuttgart Ballet in Germany.

Early life
Badenes was born in Valencia, Spain. She started ballet at Conservatorio Profesional de Danza de Valencia at age 11. In 2008, after competing at the Prix de Lausanne, she trained at The Royal Ballet School for a year with a scholarship.

Career
In 2009, Badenes became an apprentice with Stuttgart Ballet as after she graduated, and became a member of the company's corps de ballet a year later. She became a principal dancer in 2013. Roles she performed include Odette/Odile in Swan Lake, Aurora in The Sleeping Beauty, Juliet in Romeo and Juliet, Tatiana in Onegin and Baroness Mary Vetsera in Mayerling. She has also danced in productions by Jerome Robbins, George Balanchine, Hans van Manen and William Forsythe, and worked with choreographers such as Sidi Larbi Cherkaoui, Wayne McGregor and Christian Spuck. As a guest artist, Badenes performed with The Australian Ballet.

Selected repertoire
Badenes repertoire include:

A Streetcar named Desire: Stella
Kingdom of Shades from La Bayadère: Nikija
Dances at a Gathering: Pink and Apricot
La fille mal gardée: Lise
Giselle: Peasant-Pas de deux
Le Grand Pas de deux
Initials R.B.M.E.: B., Solo roles in the 1st and 4th movement
Krabat: Pumphutt
La Sylphide: Effie, Pas de huit
Lulu. A Monstre Tragedy: Lulu
Mayerling: Baroness Mary Vetsera
Onegin: Tatiana, Olga
Romeo and Juliet: Juliet, Gipsy
Swan Lake: Odette/ Odile, little swan, Pas de six
Symphony in C: 2nd and 4th movement
The Lady of the Camellias: Marguerite Gautier
The Sleeping Beauty: Aurora, Eloquence Fairy, Blue Bird's Princess
Song of the Earth
Tchaikovsky Pas de deux

Created roles

The Firebird (Sidi Larbi Cherkaoui)
A. Memory
Almost Blue
Big Blur
Black Breath
Calma Apparente
Das Fräulein von S.
Dark Glow
Il Concertone
Krabat: The Kantorka
Limelight
Little Monsters
Messenger
Naiad (Douglas Lee)NeuronsPSQiSalome: SalomeSkinnyYantra''

Awards
Badenes received following awards:
 2008 Scholarship, Prix de Lausanne
 2009 Gold medal, Youth America Grand Prix
 2011 The Audience Choice Award, Erik Bruhn Prize
 2015 German Dance Prize Future

References

Living people
Spanish ballerinas
Year of birth missing (living people)
Spanish expatriates in England
Spanish expatriates in Germany
People educated at the Royal Ballet School
21st-century ballet dancers
21st-century Spanish dancers
Stuttgart Ballet
People from Valencia